The White, the Yellow, and the Black, also known as Samurai and Shoot First... Ask Questions Later, is a 1975 Spaghetti Western comedy film.

It is the last spaghetti western directed by Sergio Corbucci. Differently from his previous western films, this is openly parodic, acting as a spoof of Red Sun. It was generally poorly received by critics. The character of Milian will be reprised by the same actor, with slight changes, in the comedy film Delitto al ristorante cinese.

Premise 
A horse from Japan which was supposed to be a present for the government of the United States has been stolen. A motley crew consisting of Sheriff Gideon ('The Black'), famous outlaw Blanc de Blanc ('The White') and inept servant Sakura ('The Yellow') tries to retrieve the precious animal. During their investigation they are confronted by a violent bunch of former soldiers of the Confederate States of America who now live as desperados.

Cast 
 Giuliano Gemma as Blanc de Blanc "Swiss"
 Tomas Milian as Sakura
 Eli Wallach as Sheriff Edward "Blackjack" Gideon
 Manuel de Blas as Major Donovan
 Jacques Berthier as Kelly Butler
 Romano Puppo as Kady
 Nazareno Zamperla as Sgt. Donovan
 Cris Huerta as Robinson Grasso
 Gary Wilson as The Sheriff

References

External links

1975 films
Spaghetti Western films
1975 Western (genre) films
Films directed by Sergio Corbucci
Films scored by Guido & Maurizio De Angelis
Films shot in Almería
1970s Italian films